Diplomatic relations between Germany and Romania began in 1880, when, following the Congress of Berlin, the German Empire recognized the independence of the Romanian Principality.

Romania joined the Axis powers in November 1940, but following King Michael's Coup of August 1944 switched sides and fought side by side with the Soviets until the Red Army reached Berlin. Between 1967 and 1989, Germany invested an estimated billion German Marks to ransom the Germans of Romania, permitting a total of 226,654 Germans to leave communist Romania.

There is a German international school in Bucharest, Deutsche Schule Bukarest. Romania has the Romanian Cultural Institute "Titu Maiorescu" in Berlin.

Germany's main European ally (September 1943 - August 1944)

After the September 1943 Armistice of Cassibile with Italy, Romania became the second Axis Power in Europe. The Romanians captured 496 Italians, mostly naval personnel (their 5 CB-class midget submarines were transferred to the Romanian Navy). Before the month was out, Germany had agreed to systematically supply the Romanian Army with German military vehicles, via the Olivenbaum I-III and Quittenbaum I programs. Deliveries started in November 1943, and by August 1944, Germany had supplied Romania with 10 times more armored vehicles (Panzer III, Panzer IV and Sturmgeschütz III) than during the entire pre-Cassibile period. Having acquired the license to produce the Messerschmitt Bf 109, Romania planned to assemble 75 from German parts. Deliveries began in May 1944, but only 6 were completed before Romania left the Axis in August 1944. Eleven more were completed by the end of the war with the remaining 58 completed after the war. In 1944, Romania had also gained access to certain Wunderwaffen, such as the Werfer-Granate 21. Technology transfers between the two countries were not necessarily one-way, however. On 6 January 1944, Ion Antonescu showed Adolf Hitler the plans of the Mareșal tank destroyer. In May 1944, Lieutenant-Colonel Ventz from the Waffenamt acknowledged that the Hetzer had followed the Romanian design. An entire German army (the 6th) came under Romanian command in May 1944, when it became part of Romanian general Petre Dumitrescu's Armeegruppe. For the first time in the war, German commanders came under the actual (rather than nominal) command of their foreign allies. This Romanian-led army group had 24 divisions of which 17 were German.

Resident diplomatic missions

 Germany has an embassy in Bucharest and consulates-general in Sibiu and Timișoara.
 Romania has an embassy in Berlin and consulates-general in Bonn, Munich and Stuttgart.

See also 
 Foreign relations of Germany 
 Foreign relations of Romania
 German Military Mission in Romania
 List of ambassadors of Germany to Romania
 Romanians in Germany
 Germans in Romania

References

External links
Bilateral relations on the Ministry of Foreign Affairs of Romania

 
Romania
Bilateral relations of Romania